Suffolk Coastal (sometimes known as Coastal Suffolk) is a parliamentary constituency in the county of Suffolk, England which has been represented in the House of Commons of the UK Parliament since 2010 by Thérèse Coffey, a Conservative Member of Parliament. She is formerly the Deputy Prime Minister of the United Kingdom and the Health Secretary. The constituency is in the far East of England, and borders the North Sea.

History
This East Anglian constituency was created for the 1983 general election from eastern parts of the abolished county constituencies of Eye, and Sudbury and Woodbridge, including the towns of Felixstowe and Woodbridge. Its initial boundaries were coterminous with the recently created District of Suffolk Coastal.

The current constituency area includes three former borough constituencies which sent their own MPs to Parliament until abolished as 'rotten boroughs' by the Great Reform Act, 1832 – Aldeburgh, Dunwich and Orford.

The seat was held from its creation until the 2010 election by the Conservative John Gummer who had previously represented the former seat of Eye from 1979. He was the Secretary of State for the Environment for four years during the Second Major ministry and before that was for four years the Minister of State for Agriculture, Fisheries and Food. He stood down in 2010 and was elevated to the House of Lords as Lord Deben.

The current MP is the Conservative Thérèse Coffey, who is currently serving in the Sunak ministry as the Secretary of State for Environment, Food and Rural Affairs. She previously served as Secretary of State for Work and Pensions between 2019 and 2022, and as the Deputy Prime Minister and Secretary of State for Health and Social Care during the short-lived Truss ministry in 2022.

Constituency profile 
The main town of the constituency is Felixstowe, which is a commercial port for imports and exports. The ONS considers Woodbridge to form part of the extended Ipswich Built-up Area. The seat includes the seaside destinations of Aldeburgh and Southwold.

Workless claimants, registered jobseekers, were in November 2012 significantly lower than the national average of 3.8%, at 2.0% of the population based on a statistical compilation by The Guardian. Since its inception Suffolk Coastal has been a safe seat for the Conservative Party typical of more rural districts of East Anglia. In the 1997 Labour national landslide the Conservative candidate held on by a margin of a few thousand votes.

Boundaries and boundary changes

1983–1997: The District of Suffolk Coastal.

1997–2010: The District of Suffolk Coastal wards of Aldeburgh, Alderton and Sutton, Bramfield and Cratfield, Buxlow, Felixstowe Central, Felixstowe East, Felixstowe North, Felixstowe South, Felixstowe South East, Felixstowe West, Hollesley, Kelsale, Kirton, Leiston, Martlesham, Melton, Nacton, Orford, Saxmundham, Snape, Trimleys, Tunstall, Ufford, Walberswick, Westleton, Woodbridge Centre, Woodbridge Farlingaye, Woodbridge Kyson, Woodbridge Riverside, Woodbridge Seckford, and Yoxford, and the District of Waveney wards of Blything, Halesworth, and Southwold.

Westernmost areas included in the new constituency of Central Suffolk and North Ipswich. Extended northwards to include three wards from the District of Waveney, transferred from the constituency of Waveney.

2010–present: The District of Suffolk Coastal wards of Aldeburgh, Farlingaye, Felixstowe East, Felixstowe North, Felixstowe South, Felixstowe South East, Felixstowe West, Hollesley with Eyke, Kyson, Leiston, Martlesham, Melton and Ufford, Nacton, Orford and Tunstall, Peasenhall, Rendlesham, Riverside, Saxmundham, Seckford, Snape, Sutton, Trimleys with Kirton, Walberswick and Wenhaston, and Yoxford, and the District of Waveney wards of Blything, Halesworth, Southwold and Reydon, and Wrentham.

Marginal changes due to revision of local authority wards.

Members of Parliament

Elections

Elections in the 2010s

Tony Love was originally standing as the Brexit Party candidate for this constituency.

Elections in the 2000s

Elections in the 1990s

Elections in the 1980s

See also
 List of parliamentary constituencies in Suffolk

Notes

References

Parliamentary constituencies in Suffolk
Constituencies of the Parliament of the United Kingdom established in 1983